U of C refers to a number of institutions of higher education around the world, including the following:

Australia
 University of Canberra (Australian Capital Territory)

Canada
 University of Calgary (Alberta)

New Zealand
 University of Canterbury (Christchurch)

Portugal
 University of Coimbra

Spain
 University of Cantabria

United Kingdom
 University of Cambridge

United States
 University of California
 University of Charleston (West Virginia)
 University of Chicago (Illinois)
 University of Cincinnati (Ohio)
 University of Colorado
 University of Connecticut